Bertrand Kiefer (born 1955) is a Swiss medical doctor, theologian and ethicist. He is editor of the Revue médicale suisse.

Bertrand Kiefer is a member of the Swiss Advisory Commission on Biomedical Ethics.

Notes and references

20th-century Swiss physicians
Swiss ethicists
University of Geneva alumni
1955 births
Living people
21st-century Swiss physicians